The United States competed at the 1976 Winter Olympics in Innsbruck, Austria.

As Lake Placid would be hosting the following Winter Olympics, the American national anthem was performed at the closing ceremony.

Medalists 

The following U.S. competitors won medals at the games. In the by discipline sections below, medalists' names are bolded. 

| width="78%" align="left" valign="top" |

| width=22% align=left valign=top |

Alpine skiing

Men

Women

Biathlon

Bobsleigh

Cross-country skiing

Men

Women

Figure skating

Individual

Mixed

Ice hockey

Summary

Roster
 Steve Alley
 Dan Bolduc
 Blane Comstock
 Bob Dobek
 Rob Harris
 Jeff Hymanson
 Paul Jensen
 Steve Jensen
 Dick Lamby
 Bob Lundeen
 Bob Miller
 Doug Ross
 Gary Ross
 Buzz Schneider
 Steve Sertich
 John Taft
 Ted Thorndike
 Jim Warden

First round
Winners (in bold) entered the Medal Round. Other teams played a consolation round for 7th-12th places.

|}

Medal round

USSR 6–2 USA
Czechoslovakia 5–0 USA
USA 5–4 Finland
USA 7–2 Poland
West Germany 4–1 USA

Luge

Men

Women

Nordic combined

Ski jumping

Speed skating

Men

Women

See also
United States at the 1976 Winter Paralympics

References
 Official Olympic Reports
 International Olympic Committee results database
 Olympic Winter Games 1976, full results by sports-reference.com
 

Nations at the 1976 Winter Olympics
1976
Oly